Heracles General Cement Corporation (Α.Γ.Ε.Τ ΗΡΑΚΛΗΣ) is a Greece-based cement, concrete and aggregates company which operates a large number of plants and  facilities throughout Greece and Switzerland.

Structure
HERACLES General Cement Company S.A. is a subsidiary of LafargeHolcim.
As of September 2018, it employs 511.

Location
The company is headquartered in Athens, Greece.

Facilities
Heracles operates three cement production plants, one of which, located in Volos, is the largest cement plant in Europe. It also operates six distribution centers around Greece.

Products and services
Heracles offers steel frame and mechanical maintenance services, as well as sea transportation and ship management services. Its main products include different grades of cement, bagged or in bulk, aggregates, and concrete, for construction or for other purposes. It also sells intermediate cement production materials, such as clinker.

References

Cement companies of Greece
Greek brands
Manufacturing companies based in Athens
Greek subsidiaries of foreign companies